The 2001 ASEAN Para Games, officially known as the 1st ASEAN Para Games, was a Southeast Asian disabled multi-sport event held a month after the 2001 Southeast Asian Games. It was held in Kuala Lumpur, Malaysia from 26 to 29 October 2001. This ASEAN Para Games was the first edition held in history for Southeast Asia countries and also the first edition hosted by Malaysia.

Around 600 athletes participated at the event which featured 341 events in 2 sports. It was opened by the Acting Yang di-Pertuan Agong of Malaysia, Sultan Mizan Zainal Abidin at the Bukit Jalil National Stadium.

The final medal tally was led by host nation Malaysia, Thailand and Myanmar.

Development and preparation 
On 28 April 2001, the 1st ASEAN Para Games Organising Committee led by Dato' Zainal Abu Zarin was formed to oversee the staging of the games after the formation of ASEAN Para Sports Federation.

Venues 
The 1st ASEAN Para Games had 2 venues for the games.

Marketing

Logo 
The logo of the 2001 ASEAN Para Games is a flower divided into 10 equally shaped triangular petals, represents the 10 ASEAN member nations, which are also the games participating nations. The 10 petal flower circular arrangement represents commitment, unity and harmony of the 10 ASEAN nations as well as equality and opportunity in sports and life for people with disabilities.

Mascot 
The mascot of the 2001 ASEAN Para Games is a mousedeer named, "Ujang". The mousedeer is a native animal in Malaysia locally known as pelanduk or kancil which is shy, but very agile and quick thinking. It is a favourite character in local folktales commonly known as "Sang Kancil", noted for its intelligence, wit, cunning feints and quick reaction to escape from all kinds of danger, especially from its enemies. The adoption of mousedeer as the games' mascot is to represent the courage of the Paralympic athletes in overcoming challenges and the odds. The name of the mascot, Ujang is a common nickname for local Malay youths.

Songs 
The theme song of the games composed by Dato' Zainal Abidin Abu Zarin and was sung by Siti Nurhaliza.

The games

Opening ceremony 
The opening ceremony was held at the Putra Stadium in Bukit Jalil at 20:00 on 26 October 2001. The games was opened the Deputy Yang di-Pertuan Agong, Mizan Zainal Abidin.

Closing ceremony 
The closing ceremony was held at the Putra Stadium in Bukit Jalil at 20:00 on 29 October 2001. The games was closed by the Minister for National Unity and Community Development, Datuk Dr Siti Zaharah Sulaiman. Thai swimmer Voravit Kaw Kham was voted the Best Sportsman title, while Theresa Goh of Singapore won the Best Sportswoman title.

Participating nations 
Around 700 athletes and officials had participated in the games.

Sports 
Only 2 Sports are contested in the 2001 ASEAN Para Games.
  Athletics
  Swimming

Medal table

Key
 Host nation (Malaysia)

See also 
 2001 Southeast Asian Games

References

External links
 ASEAN Para Games Website

ASEAN Para Games
Sport in Kuala Lumpur
2001 in Malaysian sport
2001 in Asian sport
2001 in multi-sport events
Multi-sport events in Malaysia
International sports competitions hosted by Malaysia